The Southern Maryland Athletic Conference (SMAC) is a high school athletic league in Maryland, comprising the public secondary and high schools throughout Southern Maryland. The SMAC's membership consists of the following schools located in Calvert, Charles, and St. Mary's Counties:

Calvert High School
Chopticon High School
Great Mills High School
Henry E. Lackey High School
Huntingtown High School
La Plata High School
Leonardtown High School
Maurice J. McDonough High School
Northern High School
North Point High School
Patuxent High School
Thomas Stone High School
Westlake High School
St. Charles High School 
St. Mary's Ryken High School was a member, and the only private Maryland school in a public league, but withdrew to join the Washington Catholic Athletic Conference (WCAC) in 2002.
St. Charles High School became a member of SMAC in 2014.

References

Maryland high school sports conferences